John Valder (21 September 1931-9 May 2017) was an Australian politician who was president of the federal Liberal Party of Australia and chairman of the Australian Stock Exchange. 

Valder was a founding member of the 'Not happy, John!' campaign.

References

External links
 2005 interview with Vibewire.net 

1931 births
2017 deaths
Australian businesspeople
Liberal Party of Australia
State Bank of New South Wales